Kehsna (1940 – November 2005) was a Senegalese writer. She studied in several different nations, including the United States and France, before becoming a writer in the 1980s. Her first work was La Voie du Salut and later works include En votre nom et au mien. Her writings discuss the lives and victimization of African women.

References

Sources

1940 births
2005 deaths
Senegalese writers
Senegalese women writers
International Writing Program alumni
Senegalese expatriates in France
Senegalese expatriates in the United States